Jaxon Crabb (born 7 November 1979) is a former Australian rules footballer who played as a midfielder for the West Coast Eagles and Port Adelaide Football Club.

He is the brother of former professional tennis player Jaymon Crabb.

Football career
Crabb played 188 games for WAFL club Claremont between 1997 and his retirement in 2009. He is a member of the WA Football 200 Club and shared the 2005 Sandover Medal with Toby McGrath as the best player in the WAFL for that year.

West Coast career 
Jaxon was drafted by the West Coast Eagles with the twelfth selection in the 1997 AFL Draft and played his first game for the club against Richmond. He collected 10 disposals in his first match. Crabb spent 3 years on West Coast's list, playing only 15 AFL games in that time.

Port Adelaide career 
Crabb then found himself on Port Adelaide's rookie list for the 2002 season. He played a total of 4 games during this season and was delisted upon its conclusion. Jaxon then returned to WAFL club Claremont.

References

External links

WAFL Online player profile

1979 births
Australian rules footballers from Western Australia
Claremont Football Club players
Living people
People educated at Christ Church Grammar School
People from Bunbury, Western Australia
Port Adelaide Football Club players
Port Adelaide Football Club players (all competitions)
Sandover Medal winners
South Adelaide Football Club players
South Bunbury Football Club players
West Coast Eagles players